Nicolau Vergueiro is a municipality in the state of Rio Grande do Sul, Brazil.  As of 2020, the estimated population was 1,674.
 Nicolau Pereira de Campos Vergueiro (1778-1859), was a brasilian politician and owner of coffee plantations

See also
List of municipalities in Rio Grande do Sul

References

Municipalities in Rio Grande do Sul